Diabrotica virgifera is a species of beetle in the family Chrysomelidae. It is an agricultural pest species that attacks maize. It includes two subspecies, Diabrotica virgifera virgifera (the western corn rootworm) and Diabrotica virgifera zeae (the Mexican corn rootworm).

References

Galerucinae
Beetles described in 1868
Taxa named by John Lawrence LeConte